The 2022 Inter-Provincial Trophy was the tenth edition of the Inter-Provincial Trophy, a Twenty20 cricket competition being played in Ireland in 2022. It was the fifth edition of the competition to be played with full Twenty20 status. The tournament was played as a series of three-day festivals between four teams, with the fixtures being confirmed by Cricket Ireland on 4 March 2022. North West Warriors were the defending champions, having won the 2021 competition. After a strong start to the competition by Munster Reds, which saw them top of the table going into the final festival at Sydney Parade in July, they were eventually beaten to the title on net run rate by Leinster Lightning, which was their 7th Inter-Provincial Trophy.

Points table

Fixtures

Round one

Round two

Round three

References

External links
 Series home at ESPNcricinfo

Inter
Inter-Provincial Trophy seasons